The 2001 Detroit Lions season was the franchise's 72nd season in the National Football League. Marty Mornhinweg was named the 21st head coach in franchise history on January 21, 2001, after owner William Clay Ford, Sr. controversially fired 2000 interim coach Gary Moeller.

The season began with much optimism, with the Lions hoping to improve on their 9–7 record from 2000; however, the Lions were extremely disappointing and had the worst start to an NFL season since the 1986 Indianapolis Colts began 0–13. They were widely believed to be likely to suffer the NFL’s first 0–16 season before they defeated the Minnesota Vikings. Prior to that, they had lost an NFL record nine consecutive games by eight points or less.

Seven seasons later, the Lions went 0–16 after a week 17 loss to the Green Bay Packers. 

This was the final season that the Lions played at the Pontiac Silverdome before moving to Ford Field the following season, as well as the final season for the NFC Central Division, which would dissolve following the NFL's realignment in 2002, although all NFC Central teams except the Tampa Bay Buccaneers formed the new NFC North Division. 

The Lions closed the Silverdome by defeating the Dallas Cowboys 15–10 in the regular season finale. Coincidentally, the Cowboys defeated the Lions 36–10 in the first regular season game at the Silverdome (then known as Pontiac Metropolitan Stadium) in 1975. 

This would also be the first season under new general manager Matt Millen, as he would be the team's general manager for the next six seasons and first 3 games of the 2008 season. This would start a stage of futility for the Lions, as they would fail to post a winning record with Millen as general manager.

Offseason

NFL Draft

Undrafted free agents

Staff

Roster

Regular season

Schedule

Standings

References

External links
 2001 Detroit Lions at Pro-Football-Reference.com

Detroit
Detroit Lions seasons
Detroit Lions